Jerry Obern Scheff (born January 31, 1941) is an American bassist, best known for his work with Elvis Presley from 1969 to 1977 as a member of his TCB Band and on the Doors' L.A. Woman.

Biography
Scheff grew up in Vallejo, California. After serving in the U.S. Navy he returned to California, ending up in Los Angeles as a session musician. After working at the Sands nightclub in Los Angeles with 16-year-old Billy Preston, Merry Clayton, and Don "Sugarcane" Harris, he played on his first hit record, The Association's "Along Comes Mary" (1966).

That success led to other sessions with acts such as Bobby Sherman, Johnny Mathis, Johnny Rivers, Neil Diamond, Nancy Sinatra, Pat Boone, Sammy Davis Jr., Bobby Vinton, The Monkees, The Everly Brothers, Todd Rundgren, and the Nitty Gritty Dirt Band. In 1971, he appeared on L.A. Woman, the final album recorded by the Doors with Jim Morrison, playing bass on virtually every track.

In July 1969, Scheff became a member of Elvis Presley's TCB Band.  Jerry played bass for the singer from July 31, 1969, to February 23, 1973, and again from April 24, 1975, until Presley's final show on June 26, 1977, at the Market Square Arena in Indianapolis.

He is heard on many Presley albums, beginning with From Memphis to Vegas / From Vegas to Memphis (live 1969 Vegas recordings), and including On Stage: February 1970 (live 1969-1970 Vegas recordings), That's The Way It Is (1970 film soundtrack with live Vegas recordings), Elvis As Recorded At Madison Square Garden (complete live 1972 New York concert), Aloha from Hawaii Via Satellite (complete live 1973 concert broadcast worldwide), From Elvis Presley Boulevard, Memphis, Tennessee (1976 studio work), Moody Blue (1976 studio work and 1977 live recordings).  He is also seen performing in Elvis: That's the Way It Is (1970 documentary) and Elvis On Tour (1972 documentary).

In later years, Scheff worked with Elvis Costello, Crowded House, John Denver, Willy DeVille, The Doors, Bob Dylan, Roy Orbison, Sam Phillips, Demis Roussos, Richard Thompson, Chris Hillman, Bernie Leadon, Al Perkins, David Mansfield and many other artists. Scheff was also the bassist for Southern Pacific on their debut album.  In the January 1988 Cinemax television special Roy Orbison and Friends, A Black and White Night Scheff played acoustic bass in Orbison's backing band.

Starting in 1997, Jerry joined other original TCB Band members in a project called Elvis: The Concert, a show that featured the video and isolated voice of Elvis with his 1970s backup band and vocalists playing live, perfectly synced using computer technology.  In 2009, after touring with Elvis: The Concert for a decade, Scheff left the production.

Jerry has three sons: Jason, born in 1962, Darin in 1963, and Lauren in 1973. Jason grew up to be a professional musician, most notably as the bassist and lead vocalist in the band Chicago from 1985 until 2016. During a 1993 session, Jason co-wrote "Bigger Than Elvis" as a tribute to his dad.  Featuring Jerry on bass, the track did not see release until a 2003 box set The Box.  Darin and Lauren both followed in their brother's footsteps, also becoming multi-instrumentalists, songwriters and vocalists.

In 2012, Jerry published an autobiography, Way Down: Playing Bass with Elvis, Dylan, the Doors, and More: The Autobiography of Jerry Scheff.

From 2013 to 2017 Scheff performed concerts in England with the singer Jenson Bloomer, playing the greatest hits of Elvis Presley, Bob Dylan, and the Doors. While in 2019 he made two shows in Denmark. A Concert and a talk show. Both entirely dedicated to The Doors. On both the show and the concert he performed with The Doors Tribute.

In April 2022 Jerry was back on stage, playing in a concert in Milan, Italy, with the Italian singer and guitartist, Luca Olivieri and his band, as a tribute to Elvis.

Discography

Bibliography
Way Down: Playing Bass with Elvis, Dylan, the Doors, and More: The Autobiography of Jerry Scheff

References

External links

Official Jerry Scheff Facebook Page
Elvis Australia interview with Jerry Scheff

1941 births
Living people
Musicians from Denver
American rock bass guitarists
American session musicians
TCB Band members
Southern Pacific (band) members
Guitarists from Colorado
American male bass guitarists
20th-century American bass guitarists
20th-century American male musicians